PlaneSense is a fractional aircraft ownership program managed by PlaneSense, Inc. and based in Portsmouth, New Hampshire, United States. As of the beginning of 2020, they manage a civilian fleet of 44 total program aircraft, made up of thirty-six Pilatus PC-12 aircraft, and five Pilatus PC-24 jets.  The PlaneSense fractional program provides private air transportation, primarily within the United States, Canada, Mexico, The Bahamas, the islands of the Caribbean and more recently, Cuba.  PlaneSense guarantees departure times as soon as 8 hours after a flight request, depending on the size of the aircraft share owned for domestic flights on non-peak days. PlaneSense, inc. is not, itself, an air charter provider or commercial air carrier, but charter flights can be arranged through its sister company, Cobalt Air.

History

PlaneSense, Inc., formerly named Alpha Flying, Inc. was founded in 1992.  The name was changed on 1 February 2012 to PlaneSense, Inc.. Originally based in Norwood, Massachusetts, Alpha Flying, Inc. was founded by George Antoniadis, initially as a supplemental program to the, then, Alpha Flying Club, which provided rental and management of high performance piston and turbine powered general aviation aircraft. In 1995, the PlaneSense program was founded with the first Pilatus PC-12 delivered on 9 September 1995. In 1998, they moved to a facility at Nashua Airport. In 2000, they moved to a facility at Manchester-Boston Regional Airport. In 2007, they moved to a new custom built facility  at Portsmouth International Airport at Pease in Portsmouth, New Hampshire.

The PlaneSense program achieved steady growth since its inception 25 years ago, and it has recently surpassed significant flight benchmarks. Notably, it has exceeded the milestone of 400,000 flight hours.

President and CEO of PlaneSense, Inc., George Antoniadis, explains, "PlaneSense, Inc. has built its successful business model on the Pilatus PC-12. For over twenty-one years, this versatile, efficient and reliable aircraft has served us extremely well. The PlaneSense program employs the largest civilian fleet of the PC-12 aircraft in the world, which speaks volumes about our satisfaction with the performance of the aircraft and our long lasting relationship with Pilatus."

In 1994 George Antoniadis arranged a visit to Pilatus Aircraft Stans, Switzerland, to view their new turboprop model - the PC-12. He reviewed the PC-12, analyzed its operating characteristics and soon became convinced that it was the airplane he'd been seeking. He placed an order in September 1995 and took delivery of the 20th Pilatus PC-12 off the assembly line.

The Pilatus PC-24 jet entered service in early 2018, with PlaneSense taking delivery of the first production model.  Building on the success of the Pilatus PC-12 turboprops, the PC-24 aims to offer PC-12 versatility with turbojet powered performance. PlaneSense is the launch customer with a preliminary order for six jets under contract. Before taking delivery of the PC-24, PlaneSense purchased four Nextant 400XTi aircraft but now the jet program is dedicated to the PC-24 fleet.

Fleet

External links
PlaneSense Website
Pilatus Aircraft Website
Nextant Aerospace Website

See also
Fractional ownership of aircraft
AirSprint
Flexjet
NetJets

References

Airlines based in New Hampshire
Airlines established in 1995
Companies based in Portsmouth, New Hampshire